The 2023 Kentucky Attorney General election will take place on November 7, 2023, to elect the Attorney General of Kentucky. Incumbent Republican Attorney General Daniel Cameron is retiring to run for governor.

Republican primary

Candidates

Declared
Russell Coleman, former U.S. Attorney for the Western District of Kentucky

Declined
Michael Adams, Kentucky Secretary of State (running for re-election)
Allison Ball, Kentucky State Treasurer (running for state auditor)
Daniel Cameron, incumbent attorney general (running for governor)
Whitney Westerfield, state senator, nominee for attorney general in 2015 and candidate in 2019

Endorsements

Results

Democratic primary

Candidates

Declared
Pamela Stevenson, state representative for the 43rd District

Endorsements

Results

References

External links
Official campaign websites
Russell Coleman (R) for Attorney General
Pamela Stevenson (D) for Attorney General

Attorney General
Kentucky
Kentucky Attorney General elections